La-erabum or Lasirab ( la-é-ra-ab also read la-a3-ra-ab, formerly read la-si-ra-ab, fl. circa 2150 BCE) was the 12th Gutian ruler of the Gutian Dynasty of Sumer.

Sumerian King List 

La-erabum is mentioned in the "Sumerian King List" (SKL). According to the SKL: La-erabum was the successor of Apilkin. Irarum then succeeded La-erabum, also according to the SKL.

Votive macehead 
A votive macehead with his name is located in the British Museum (BM 90852). It was excavated in ancient Sippar. The macehead inscription reads:

See also 

 History of Sumer
 List of Mesopotamian dynasties

References 

22nd-century BC Sumerian kings
Gutian dynasty of Sumer